Mária Royová (26 November 1858 – 25 February 1924) was a Slovak Protestant activist, charity worker and songwriter.

She and her sister Kristína Royová founded the Blue Cross Organization and diaconical centre in Stará Turá.

References

Slovak religious leaders
Slovak Lutherans
1858 births
1924 deaths